One Nine Nine Four is a documentary film written and directed by Jai Al-Attas, "exploring the birth, growth and eventual tipping point of punk rock during the 90s" and produced by the independent Australian company Robot Academy Films. The bulk of the film's content consists of band interviews and archive footage.
The film was screened once at the Calgary International Film Festival on September, 29th.

The film is narrated by skateboarder Tony Hawk and features interviews and footage of various bands and figures in the punk scene including Billie Joe Armstrong of Green Day, Dexter Holland from The Offspring, Greg Graffin and Brett Gurewitz from Bad Religion, Tim Armstrong, Matt Freeman (previously of Operation Ivy) and Lars Fredriksen from Rancid, Fat Mike from NOFX as well as Mark Hoppus and Tom DeLonge from Blink-182.

Music clearances fees have prevented the producer from legally releasing the film; it has only been screened twice, once at the Calgary International Film Festival, and once at a "fan-only" screening at The Chauvel Cinema in Sydney, Australia. The filmmakers have turned to fund raising in order to release it publicly.

The last public update before the free release of the documentary was released to fans was in March 2011 via the "One Nine Nine Four" Facebook page. The update reads; "alright fuck it, i'm working on a way to make this free for you all."

The documentary was released on YouTube on April 18, 2012.

Featured interviews with

 Fat Mike - NOFX / Fat Wreck Chords
 Tim Armstrong - Rancid / Hellcat Records
 Lars Frederiksen – Rancid
 Matt Freeman – Rancid
 Billie Joe Armstrong - Green Day
 Joey Cape – Lagwagon
 Mark Hoppus - Blink-182
 Tom DeLonge - Blink-182
 Brett Gurewitz - Bad Religion / Epitaph
 Greg Graffin - Bad Religion
 Fletcher Dragge – Pennywise
 Tony Sly - No Use for a Name
 Scott Russo - Unwritten Law
 John Feldmann – Goldfinger
 Dexter Holland - The Offspring / Nitro Records
 Joe Escalante - The Vandals / Kung Fu Records
 Larry Livermore - Lookout! Records
 Kevin Lyman - Warped Tour
 Rick Devoe - Blink-182 Manager / Big Dummy Productions
 Andy Somers - Booking Agent
 Ryan Greene – Producer
 Rob Cavallo - A&R / Producer
 Matt Messer - A&R
 Tim Curran - Professional Surfer

References

External links
 
 

2009 films
Documentary films about punk music and musicians
2000s English-language films